Vassås is a small village in the municipality of Bindal in Nordland county, Norway. It is located along the Tosen arm of the Bindalsfjorden, just north of the Vassås Bridge which connects the village to the larger village of Terråk. This is also the site of Vassås Church, the parish church for this part of Bindal.

References

Villages in Nordland
Bindal